Alexander Laas (born 5 May 1984, in Hamburg-Niendorf) is a retired German attacking midfielder. He retired in 2014.

Honours
Hamburger SV
UEFA Intertoto Cup: 2005

References

External links 
 

1984 births
Living people
German footballers
Hamburger SV players
Hamburger SV II players
VfL Wolfsburg players
Arminia Bielefeld players
Footballers from Hamburg
Bundesliga players
RB Leipzig players
Association football midfielders